Goldenisland (St. George) is a small townland in Athlone, County Westmeath, Ireland. The townland is located to the south of the town, and is bordered by Goldenisland (Kilmaine) to the west and south and by the townland of Athlone to the north.

References 

Townlands of County Westmeath